Richard Armstrong may refer to:

 Richard Armstrong (author) (1903–1986), winner of the 1948 Carnegie medal for children's literature
 Sir Richard Armstrong (British Army officer) (1782–1854), British army officer
 Sir Richard Armstrong (conductor) (born 1943), British conductor
 Richard Armstrong (Hawaii missionary) (1805–1860), missionary and educator
 Richard Armstrong (museum director) (born 1949), American museum director
 Richard Armstrong (politician) (1815–1880), UK MP for the Irish borough constituency of Sligo, 1865–1868
 Richard Lee Armstrong (1937–1991), American-Canadian geologist

See also 
 Dick Armstrong (disambiguation)